Mycena zephirus is a species of agaric fungus in the family Mycenaceae. It is bioluminescent.

See also
List of bioluminescent fungi

References

External links

zephirus
Bioluminescent fungi
Fungi described in 1818
Fungi of Europe
Taxa named by Elias Magnus Fries